The Indian Twenty 20 Cricket Federation, or ITCF, is headquartered at Patiala, Punjab, India. The federation was formed in April 2001 as the national governing body for the Twenty20 format of cricket in India.

This Cricket federation is registered with the Registrar of Firms & Societies under the 1860 Society Act. To become a member of a state-level association, an applicant needs to be introduced by another member and has to pay an annual fee. The state-level associations select their representatives who in turn select the ITCF officials.

As a member of the International Twenty 20 Cricket Federation, it has the authority to select players, umpires and officials to participate in the events and exercises total control. Without its recognition, no competitive cricket involving ITCF-contracted Indian players can be hosted within or outside the country.

Shri Piyush Rana is the Founder Honorary Secretary General and TM owner of ITCF.

Indian Premier Corporate League (IPCL) 
IPCL Indian Premier Corporate League (IPCL) is an official Tournament Of Indian Twenty 20 Cricket Federation (ITCF INDIA)

Zones
1. North Zone

2. West Zone

3. South Zone

4. Central Zone

5. East Zone

Women's Cricket
All India Women Twenty 20 Cricket Association, the AWTCA

See also
Himachal Pradesh Rural Cricket League

References

Cricket administration in India
Sports organizations established in 2001
2001 establishments in Punjab, India